Edison Franklin "Eddie" Hunter (February 6, 1905 – March 14, 1967) was a Major League Baseball third baseman who played with the Cincinnati Reds in . He played one game, as a defensive replacement. He did not get an at bat.

External links

Cincinnati Reds players
1905 births
1967 deaths
Baseball players from Kentucky
People from Bellevue, Kentucky